Our Mutual Friend is a British television serial broadcast in 1998 and adapted from Charles Dickens's novel Our Mutual Friend (1864–1865).

Cast

 Anna Friel as Bella Wilfer
 Steven Mackintosh as John Harmon
 Keeley Hawes as Lizzie Hexam
 Paul McGann as Eugene Wrayburn
 Peter Vaughan as Mr. Boffin
 David Morrissey as Bradley Headstone
 Dominic Mafham as Mortimer Lightwood
 David Bradley as Rogue Riderhood
 Kenneth Cranham as Silas Wegg
 Timothy Spall as Mr. Venus
 Pam Ferris as Mrs. Boffin
 Katy Murphy as Jenny Wren
 Doon Mackichan as Sophronia Lammle
 Anthony Calf as Alfred Lammle
 Michael Culkin as Mr. Veneering
 Martin Hancock as Sloppy
 Edna Doré as Betty Higden
 Margaret Tyzack as Lady Tippins
 Roger Frost as police inspector
 David Schofield as Gaffer Hexam
 Paul Bailey as Charley Hexam
 Peter Wright as Mr. Wilfer
 Heather Tobias as Mrs. Wilfer
 Catriona Yuill as Lavinia Wilfer

Production
The Kingswear Castle paddlesteamer was used for the drama. The scene was shot on the River Medway next to the boat's then moorings in The Historic Dockyard Chatham. In 2013 the ship returned to use on the River Dart in Devon.  Bella Wilfer and the Boffin family go on a family day out. The back streets of the workhouse were filmed in The Historic Dockyard Chatham.

Awards
Winner:
1999: British Academy of Film and Television Arts - Best Design, Best Drama Serial, Best Sound, Best Make Up

Nominated:
1999: Broadcasting Press Guild Awards - Best Actor, Best Drama

References

External links
 
Our Mutual Friend at PBS

1990s British drama television series
BBC television dramas
Television shows based on works by Charles Dickens
Television shows based on British novels
1998 British television series debuts
1998 British television series endings
Our Mutual Friend